The Stansted Airport Track Transit System (TTS) is a fully automated people mover system which operates within London Stansted Airport in the United Kingdom.

The transit system conveys air passengers between the main airport terminal and the departure/arrival gates, which are located some distance from the main terminal in satellite buildings. The system operates exclusively "airside", meaning that it can only by accessed by passengers who have first passed through airport security. The transit is provided free of charge and being electric far less polluting than the diesel buses that serve the car parks and remote aircraft stands.

History 
The Stansted Airport Transit System was opened in 1991. It was constructed as a result of the decision by the British Airports Authority (BAA) to redevelop the airport with an arrangement of satellite buildings detached from the main terminal. The BAA considered several options for conveying passengers safely and rapidly to the airport gates, including moving walkways, tunnels, bridges and bus links, before opting for an automated tracked transit system. After opening in 1991 the system was extended in 1998 with an additional two underground stations, to serve a second and a third satellite building.

Route

Guideway 
The Stansted Airport TTS vehicles run along a double-track guideway totalling  in length which connects the main terminal building with three satellite buildings. The route begins on an elevated section alongside the departure lounge, before entering a tunnel which passes beneath the airport apron. There is a maintenance depot at one end.

Stations 
The Transit System has three stations: Terminal (arrivals and departures), Gates 1–19 (Satellite 1 arrivals and departures) and Gates 20–39 (Satellite 2 arrivals and departures). Satellite 3 (Gates 40–59) is not served by the Transit System; instead a pedestrian footway links the gates with the main terminal.

Each station has segregated boarding and alighting platforms, allowing a more efficient passenger flow. All boarding points are equipped with platform screen doors.

Vehicles 

5 Adtranz C-100 cars built by Westinghouse for the system, with car bodies built in Scotland by Walter Alexander before being shipped to Pittsburgh for assembly and testing, are still in service today. This was increased to 9 when 4 new Adtranz CX-100 cars were delivered during the 1998 expansion. During normal operation, eight out of the nine cars will be in service to maintain a 99.98% availability record. The cars can operate as single-, double-, or triple-unit trains that can be easily accessed by disabled passengers. The trains are fully automated and driverless, classed as a Grade of Automation level 4 (unattended) system and regulated under Office of Rail Regulation. The Stansted TTS is currently the world's last remaining APM system to use the Adtranz C-100 rolling stock.

Pictures

See also 

 Gatwick Airport Shuttle Transit
 Heathrow Terminal 5 Transit
 Luton DART

References 

Airport people mover systems in the United Kingdom
Innovia people movers
Transit System
Rail transport in Essex
Railway stations opened in 1991
1991 establishments in England